Top 100 Mexico is a record chart published weekly by AMPROFON (Asociación Mexicana de Productores de Fonogramas y Videogramas), a non-profit organization composed by Mexican and multinational record companies. This association tracks record sales (physical and digital) in Mexico. On July 2, the chart was publicly updated for the last time along with the list of 100 best-selling albums for the middle of the year. As of July 9, the chart was discontinued.

Chart history

See also
List of number-one songs of 2020 (Mexico)

References

Number-one albums
Mexico
2020